Richard L. Tillman, known as Dick Tillman, (November 27, 1936 – October 14, 2020) was an American sailor. He was a member of the United States sailing team at the 1976 Summer Olympics as an alternate and was named US Sailor of the Year in 1965.

He started sailing as a teenager at Wawasee Yacht Club crewing for Alan (Buzz) Levinson, his older brother Frank and his younger brother, Harry, in their Snipes.

College
Dick Tillman was National Intercollegiate Sailing Champion with the U.S. Naval Academy in 1957, and became a member of the ICSA Hall of Fame for Competitive Achievement after graduation in 1958.

Sailing career
Dick Tillman holds national, north American and world titles in the Snipe, Finn, Laser and Sunfish classes: 
U.S. National Champion in Snipe (1959), Finn (1965), 
North American Champion in Laser (1971, 1972 and 1973), and Finn (1965).

He also won a bronze medal at the 1959 Pan American Games in Snipe.

In the Masters category, he also holds several championships:
International Sunfish Masters Champion in 1995, 1996, 1998 and 2002.
World Great Grand Masters Laser radial Champion in 2002.
North American Laser Masters Champion in 1981 and 1982.
World Masters Games
Silver Medalist at the 1998 Nike World Masters in Windsurfing
Bronze Medalist at the 1998 Nike World Masters in Laser

Organizational activities
Dick Tillman has been a member of the United States Sailing Association for over 30 years and director for 3 years (1999-2002), chair of National Single-handed Championship Committee for 7 years, commodore of the Snipe Class International Racing Association (1971), sailing representative to USOC Athletes Advisory Council (1976-1980), Executive Director of the International J/24 Class Association (1981-1991), and president of the US Windsurfing Association, president of the International Sunfish Class Association (2002-2006).

Books
He wrote The Complete Book of Laser Sailing, published by McGraw Hill in 2005.

References

External links
Interview with Dick Tillman - Snipe Sailor

Living people
American male sailors (sport)
Finn class sailors
Laser class sailors
Sailors at the 1959 Pan American Games
Snipe class sailors
US Sailor of the Year
Pan American Games medalists in sailing
Pan American Games bronze medalists for the United States
Navy Midshipmen sailors
Medalists at the 1959 Pan American Games
1936 births